= Traktorozavodsky City District =

Traktorozavodsky City District is the name of several city divisions in Russia. The name literally means "pertaining to a tractor plant".

- Traktorozavodsky City District, Chelyabinsk, an administrative and municipal city district of Chelyabinsk, the administrative center of Chelyabinsk Oblast
- Traktorozavodsky City District, Volgograd, a city district of Volgograd, the administrative center of Volgograd Oblast
Cities in Russia with a city division called "Traktorozavodsky"
